This list of missiles by country displays the names of missiles in order of the country where they originate (were developed), with the countries listed alphabetically and annotated with their continent (and defence alliance, if applicable). In cases where multiple nations have developed or produced a missile, it is listed under each significantly participating nation. Within the lists of each country, missiles are ordered by designation and/or calling name (the latter being especially relevant for Russian/Soviet missiles). In some cases multiple listings are used, in order to provide cross-references for easier navigation. 
 
This is a list of missiles developed by a particular country;  a list of Military rockets. Anti-tank missiles are listed elsewhere

For an alphabetical list by missile name, see the list of missiles.

Argentina 

Alacrán  (a short-range exploratory development based on the Condor I program)
AS-25K anti-ship missile (AShM), air-to-surface missile (ASM) 
Cóndor I (with major contributions of German technology)
Cóndor II (in cooperation with several Middle-Eastern countries)
Cóndor III 
Martin Pescador MP-1000 anti-ship missile (AShM), air-to-surface missile (ASM) 
Mathogo anti-tank guided missile (ATGM)

Australia 

Ikara
Malkara (Australian-British)
Nulka 
Evolved SeaSparrow Missile (ESSM) as part of consortium development of RIM-162 ESSM

Brazil 

A-Darter Fifth generation short range infrared homing air-to-air missile (joint South Africa/Brazil)
FOG-MPM Fiber-Optical-Guided-Multipurpose-missile.
AVMT-300 GPS and/or laser-guided long-range missile
MAA-1A Piranha short-range infrared-homing air-to-air missile.
MAA-1B Piranha air-to-air missile, also known as "Piranha II".
MSS-1.2 AC antitank guided missile.
 MSA-3.1 AAé antiaircraft guided missile.
 MAS-5.1 air-to-ground missile
MAR-1 antiradiation missile (ARM).	
MAN-1 (MANSUP) antiship missile
 MICLA-BR cruise missile

Canada 

AMADS
Eryx (Franco-Canadian)
Velvet Glove

China 

Missiles:
 HY-2 (Hai Ying)  short-range antiship subsonic cruise missile
 YJ-83 (Ying Ji) Antiship missile
 YJ-91 Antiship missile
 YJ-7 Antiship missile
 YJ-62 Antiship missile
 YJ-12 Antiship missile
 YJ-18 Antiship/Land-attack missile

 CJ-10 (DF-10) (Chang Jian) Land-attack cruise missile
 KD-88 (Kong Di) Land-attack cruise missile

 PL-5 (Pi Li)AAM
 PL-7 AAM
 PL-8 AAM
 PL-9 AAM/SAM
 PL-10 AAM
 PL-11 AAM
 PL-12 AAM
 PL-15 AAM
 TY-90 AAM

 CSS-2
 DF-3A (Dong Feng) MRBM
 DF-4 IRBM
 DF-5 ICBM
 DF-11 SRBM
 DF-15 SRBM
 DF-16 SRBM
 DF-17 SRBM
 DF-21 MRBM/ASBM
 DF-26 MRBM/ASBM
 DF-31  ICBM Range:8000 km
 DF-31A/DF-31AG ICBM Range:10000~13000 km
 DF-41 ICBM 
 DH-10 LACM

 JL-1 (Ju Lang)SLBM
 JL-2 SLBM Range:8000 km
 JL-3 SLBM

 HQ-1 (Hong Qi)SAM
 HQ-2 SAM
 Hongnu-5 SAM
 HQ-7 SAM
 HQ-9 SAM
 HQ-16 SAM
 HQ-10 SAM
 HQ-15 SAM
 HQ-17 SAM
 HQ-18 SAM
 HQ-61 SAM
 KS-1 (Kai Shan)SAM
 LY-60 (Lie Ying)SAM
 QW-1(Qian Wei) SAM
 QW-2 SAM

 CY-1 Series (Chang Ying) Anti-submarine Missile
 Yu-8 Anti-submarine Missile

 HJ-8  (Hong Jian)Anti-Tank Missile
 HJ-9 Anti-Tank Missile
 HJ-10 Anti-Tank Missile
 HJ-12 Anti-Tank Missile

European joint-venture 

 ASGLA (Igla missile) (Germano-Ukrainian) land-based VSHORAD system
 ASRAD-R (Bolide missile) (Germano-Swedish) land-based VSHORAD system
 ASRAD-R Naval (Bolide missile) (Germano-Swedish) shipboard VSHORAD system
 Cobra (Germano-Swiss)
 Cobra 2000 (Germano-Swiss)
 Euromissile HOT (Franco-German) antitank missile
 FC/ASW / FMAN/FMC (Franco-British)
 Falcon (IRIS-T SL missile) (Germano-Swedish-American) land-based SHORAD system
 MGBADS (IRIS-T SL missile) (Germano-Danish-Norwegian) land-based SHORAD system
 RBS-98 (IRIS-T SL missile) (Germano-Swedish) land-based SHORAD system
 IRIS-T (Germano-Italian-Swedish-Greek-Norwegian-Spanish)
 IDAS (Germano-Norwegian-Turkish) submarine-launched anti-air/ship/land missile
 ForceSHIELD (Starstreak missile) (Franco-British) land-based VSHORAD system
 Mamba (Germano-Swiss)
 Martel (Franco-British) Models AJ 168 and AS.37
 NLAW (British-Swedish)
 MEADS (PAC-3 MSE missile) (Germano-Italian-American) (cancelled) land-based MRAD system
 MBDA Meteor (Franco-German-British-Italian-Swedish) air-to-air missile
 MILAN (Franco-German)
 MIM-115 Roland (Franco-German) (replaced by LFK NG)
 Mosquito (Germano-Swiss)
 Otomat (Franco-Italian)
 Polyphem (Franco-German) (cancelled)
 PAAMS / Sea Viper (MBDA Aster missile) (Franco-British-Italian) shipboard SHORAD/MRAD system
 SAMP/T (MBDA Aster missile) (Franco-Italian) land-based SHORAD/MRAD system
 Sea Venom / ANL (Franco-British)
 Storm Shadow / SCALP EG (Franco-British)
 Taurus KEPD 150/350 (Germano-Swedish)

France 

 A3SM (Mistral missile) submarine mast VSHORAD system
 A3SM (MICA missile) SLAM
 AASM
 Apache
 AS.15
 AS.20
 AS.30
 ASMP
 Crotale surface-to-air missile
 ENTAC (MGM-32)
 Eryx (Franco-Canadian)
 Exocet anti-ship missile
 Exocet MM38 surface-launched 
 Exocet AM39 air-launched 
 Exocet SM39 submarine-launched 
 Exocet MM40 surface-launched 
 Hadès
 M1
 M2
 M20
 M4
 M45
 M51
 Malafon
 Masurca (Naval SAM)
 MdCN
 MHT/MLP
 MICA
 Mistral
 MMP (anti-tank)
 MMP/SEA LAUNCHED (ship-to-ship/shore)
 Pluton
 R.530
 S1
 S2
 S3
 SS.10 (MGM-21A)
 SS.11 (AGM-22)
 SS.12 / AS.12
 Super 530

Germany 

AGM Armiger
AS.34 Kormoran 1/2
 ASRAD (Stinger, RBS-70 mk2, Igla, Mistral, Starburst missiles) land-based VSHORAD system
 ASRAD-2 land-based VSHORAD system
 Enforcer
EuroSpike (Germano-Israeli)
IRIS-T SL
LFK NG
PARS 3 LR
RIM-116 RAM (Germano-American)
TLVS (PAC-3 MSE, IRIS-T SL missiles) (Germano-American) land-based SHORAD/MRAD system

German missiles of World War II

V-1 flying bomb
V-2 rocket
Enzian
Wasserfall
Ruhrstahl X-4
Henschel Hs 117 Schmetterling
Rheinbote
Rheintochter
Henschel Hs 293
Fritz X
Feuerlilie

Greece 
 Aris AA missile system (cancelled)

India 

Akash: surface-to-air missile.
Akash-NG: successor to Akash and Akash-1S surface-to-air missiles.
MR-SAM (Barak 8)- Medium range surface to air missile Abhra developed by joint venture of India-Israel. 

Nag: anti-tank missile
Helina: Air-launched version of Nag anti-tank missile.
SANT Missile: Standoff anti-tank missile
Amogha: anti-tank missile.
SAMHO (missile)
DRDO Anti Tank Missile
MPATGM - Man-Portable Anti-Tank Guided Missile
DRDO SAAW: Precision guided anti airfield bomb
Prithvi
Prithvi-I (SS-150): surface-to-surface ballistic missile.
Prithvi-II (SS-250): surface-to-surface ballistic missile.
Prithvi-III (SS-350): surface-to-surface ballistic missile.
Dhanush: ship-launched surface-to-surface ballistic missile.
Agni
 Agni-I MRBM: surface-to-surface medium-range ballistic missile.
 Agni-II MRBM: surface-to-surface medium-range ballistic missile.
 Agni-III IRBM: surface-to-surface intermediate-range ballistic missile.
 Agni-IV IRBM: surface-to-surface intermediate-range ballistic missile.
  Agni-V ICBM: surface-to-surface intercontinental ballistic missile.
Agni-P:Two-stage Nuclear Capable Intercontinental ballistic missile.
Agni:VI: Hypersonic intercontinental ballistic missile. Range: 11,000km to 12,000km (under development)
Surya: Intercontinental ballistic missile. Range: 8000km - 17000km (under development)
SMART (Supersonic Missile Assisted Release of Torpedo)
K Missile family
K 15 Sagarika: submarine-launched ballistic missile.
K 4: submarine-launched ballistic missile.
K-5: submarine-launched ballistic missile. (under development)
K-6: submarine launched intercontinental ballistic missile. (under development)
Shaurya: surface-to-surface hypersonic tactical missile.
BrahMos: cruise missile.
BrahMos-A: air-launched cruise missile.
BrahMos-NG: miniature version based on the BrahMos (under development).
BrahMos-II: hypersonic missile (under development).
Rudram-I/II/III Next generation anti-radiation missile 
Astra BVRAAM: active radar homing beyond-visual-range missile.
DRDO SFDR BVRAAM: Solid Fuel Ducted Ramjet propulsion based air to air missile
Novator KS-172 is a Russian/Indian air-to-air missile designed as an "AWACS killer" at ranges up to 400 km. 
DRDO Anti-Radiation Missile: air-to-surface antiradiation missile (under development).
NASM-SR (Short Range - Naval Anti-Ship Missile) (under Testing)
Naval anti ship missile -MR ( Medium Range Anti Ship Missile) ( under development)
Nirbhay: Long-range subsonic cruise missile.
Prahaar: tactical short-range ballistic missile.
Pragati: Export variant of Prahaar with slightly higher range than Prahaar
Pranash: Higher range variant of Prahaar
Pralay  short range ballistic missile
HGV-202F hypersonic glide vehicle (under development)
HSTDV  Hypersonic Technology Demonstrator Vehicle

Pinaka: guided rockets (Pinaka Mk1 unguided & MK2 guided rockets, Pinaka Mk III in development)
Barak 8: long-range surface-to-air missile.
Maitri DRDO quick-reaction surface-to-air missile. (cancelled)
QRSAM DRDO, BEL and BDL's quick reaction surface-to-air missile.
 IAF's SAMAR Air Defence System
VL-SRSAM : DRDL and BDL's short range surface-to-air missile.
DRDO VSHORAD 
Trishul: surface-to-air missile.
Prithvi Air Defence (Pradyumna ballistic missile interceptor): exo-atmospheric anti-ballistic missile.
Advanced Air Defence (Ashwin Ballistic Missile Interceptor): endo-atmospheric anti-ballistic missile.
Prithvi Defence Vehicle: anti-ballistic missile.
 PDV MkI
 PDV MkII (ASAT & ICBM interceptor)
AD-1 :endo-atmospheric and low exo-atmospheric anti-ballistic missile. (under Testing)
AD-2 : exo-atmospheric anti-ballistic missile (under development)
 XRSAM: Long-range surface to air missile

Iran 

Arash 122 mm unguided artillery rocket
Ashoura Two stage Solid fueled MRBM
Bavar-373 long range road mobile surface-to-air missile 
Bina laser guided dual capability surface to surface and Air-to-surface missile
Dehlaviyeh man-portable ATGM
Dezful MRBM
Emad liquid fueled MRBM
Fajr Multiple launch rocket systems:
Fajr-1 towed 107 mm Multiple rocket launcher
Fajr-3 heavy wheeled 240 mm Multiple rocket launcher
Fajr-5 333 mm long range Multiple rocket launcher
Fajr-3 liquid fueled MRBM
Fajr-4 air-to-surface guided rocket
Fakour-90 long rage Air-to-air missile
Falaq Multiple launch rocket systems:
Falaq-1 240 mm Multiple rocket launcher
Falaq-2 333 mm Multiple rocket launcher
Fateh-110 road-mobile single-stage solid-fueled surface-to-surface missile
Fateh-313 Solid fueled SRBM
Fateh Mobin single-stage solid propelled Terminal Infrared homing dual surface-to-surface and anti-ship short-range ballistic missile
Fatter short range Air-to-air missile
Ghadir Anti-ship cruise missile(ASCM), dual land-based and ship-based launch platform compatible
Ghadr-110 Two stage MRBM
Haseb short-range 107 mm artillery rocket
Herz-9 mobile short-range air defense system
Hoot supercavitation Torpedo
Hormoz anti-ship ballistic missiles:
Hormoz-1 Anti-ship/anti-radiation (ARM) ballistic missile
Hormoz-2 Anti-ship/anti-radiation (ARM) ballistic missile
Hoveyzeh all-weather surface-to-surface cruise missile
Jask-2 short-range SLCM
Kamin-2 wheeled, road-mobile short-range air defense system
Khalij Fars single stage Solid fueled supersonic Anti-ship Quasi Ballistic missile
Khordad 15 surface-to-air missile system
Khorramshahr liquid fueled MRBM
Kowsar Medium range, land-based Solid fueled Anti-ship missile
Mersad low to mid range air defense system
Mehrab intermediate range Solid fueled smart surface-to-air missile
Meshkat Medium range cruise missile under development
Misagh MANPADS:
Misagh-1 man-portable infrared-guided surface-to-air missile
Misagh-2 man-portable infrared-guided surface-to-air missile
Misagh-3 man-portable infrared-guided surface-to-air missile
Nasr-1 short range anti ship missile
Nasr-e Basir Anti-ship Cruise missile(ASCM)
Naze'at Artillery rockets:
Naze'at 6-H Solid fueled 356 mm
Naze'at 10-H Solid fueled 457 mm
Noor short-range 122 mm artillery rocket
Noor long-range anti-ship cruise missile(ASCM)
Oghab unguided 230 mm artillery rocket
Qader medium-range anti-ship cruise missile(ASCM)
Qased 3 Smart Electro-optically Guided ALCM
Qaem SACLOS beam-riding SHORAD surface-to-air missile
Qiam 1 SRBM
Ra'ad medium-range aerial defence system
Ra'ad wire-guided ATGM
Ra'ad subsonic anti-ship cruise missile(ASCM)
Ra'ad-500 short-range ballistic missile
Sadid-1 TV-guided ATGM
Saegheh wire-guided SACLOS ATGM
Saegheh 40 mm anti-personnel rocket
Saegheh short-range surface-to-surface missile
Samen road-mobile solid propelled SRBM
Sayyad surface-to-air missiles:
Sayyad-1 high-altitude command guided Air defence system
Sayyad-2 Mid-range, high altitude solid-fueled surface-to-air missile
Sayyad-3 Long-range, high altitude solid-fueled surface-to-air missile
Sayyad-4 Long-range, high altitude solid-fueled surface-to-air missile
Sevom Khordad medium-range aerial defence system
Sejjil solid-fueled MRBM
Shahab Ballistic missiles:
Shahab-1 TBM
Shahab-2 SRBM
Shahab-3 MRBM
Shahab-4 MRBM
Shahab-5 IRBM
Shahab-6 ICBM
Shahin artillery rockets:
Shahin-1 Iranian road-mobile truck mounted short-range fin-stabilized unguided 333 mm Artillery rocket
Shahin-2 Iranian road-mobile truck mounted short-range fin-stabilized unguided 333 mm Artillery rocket
Shahin medium-range supersonic surface-to-air missile/Anti-ballistic missile
Shalamcheh medium-range supersonic surface-to-air missile
Soumar long-range cruise missile
Tabas medium-range aerial defence system
Taer 2 mid-range radar guided Solid propelled Surface-to-air missile
Talash 3 long-range mobile surface-to-air missile system
Tondar laser beam riding ATGM
Tondar-69 SRBM
Toophan SACLOS ATGM
Valfajr modern homing torpedo system
Ya-Ali ALCM
Ya Zahra short-range Air defence system
Zafar short-range, anti-ship cruise missile(ASCM)
Zelzal Artillery rocket:
Zelzal-1 heavy artillery rocket
Zelzal-2 610 mm long-range artillery rocket
Zelzal-3 610 mm longer range artillery rocket
Zolfaghar road-mobile single-stage Solid-propelled SRBM
Zoobin TV-guided air-to-surface missile

Iraq 

 Al-Samoud 2
 Ababil-100
 Al Fahd 300
 Al Fahd 500
 Al Hussein
 Al Hijarah
 Al Abbas
 Badr 2000
 Al-Tammuz
 Al'Ubur
 Jinin (missile)
 Al Faw 150/200
 Al-Barq
 Al-Kasir

Israel 

 Arrow antiballistic missile (ABM)
 Barak 1 (naval point defense)
 Barak 8 (naval area defense)
 Delilah (cruise missile of several variants: drone, air-to-ground, possible antiradiation version as well)
 David's Sling/Magic Wand (land-based MRAD system)
 Derby (air-to-air, also known as the "Alto", with also a ground-to-air version for the SPYDER system)
 Gabriel (ship-to-ship, shore-to-ship, and air-to-ship variants)
 Iron Dome (land-based C-RAM and SHORAD system)
 C-Dome (shipboard SHORAD system)
 Jericho II IRBM (ground-to-ground ballistic)
 Jericho III ICBM (ground-to-ground ballistic)
 LAHAT (guided antitank)
 LORA (ground-to-ground and sea-to-ground)
 Nimrod (guided antitank and stand-off)
 Popeye (air-to-ground cruise missile. USAF designation: AGM-142 Have Nap. Possibly larger derivatives exist as well, including a submarine-launched variant)
 Python 5 (air-to-air, with also a ground-to-air version for the SPYDER system)
 SkySniper (air-to-ground)
 Sparrow (target missile)
 Spike/Gil (man-portable antitank guided missile, tactical ground-to-ground (Spike NLOS))
 Naval Spike (ship-to-ship/shore)
 SPYDER (Python, Derby missiles) land-based SHORAD/MRAD system

Italy 

 Alfa
 Aspide
 CAMM-ER "Common Anti-aircraft Modular Missile - Extended Range" (Italo-British)
 Sea Killer/Marte

Japan 

 AAM-1 (Type 69 air-to-air missile)
 AAM-2 (Program was cancelled)
 AAM-3 (Type 90 air-to-air missile)
 AAM-4 (Type 99 air-to-air missile)
 AAM-4B
 AAM-5 (Type 04 air-to-air missile)
 AAM-5B (Development)
 ASM-1 (Type 80 air-to-ship missile)
 ASM-1C (Type 91 air-to-ship missile)
 ASM-2 (Type 93 air-to-ship missile)
 ASM-2B
 ASM-3
 ASM-3A (Development)
 ATM-1 (Type 64 antitank missile)
 ATM-2 (Type 79 antitank missile)
 ATM-3 (Type 87 antitank missile)
 ATM-4 (Type 96 multipurpose missile system)
 ATM-5 (Type 01 light antitank missile)
 ATM-6 (medium-range multipurpose missile)
 SAM-1 (Type 81 short-range surface-to-air missile) (SAM)
 SAM-1B
 SAM-1C
 SAM-2 (Type 91 man-portable surface-to-air missile) (SAM)
 SAM-2B
 SAM-3 (Type 93 short-range surface-to-air missile)
 SAM-4 (Type 03 medium-range surface-to-air missile)
 SAM-4B (Development)
 Type 11 short-range surface-to-air missile (SAM)
 SSM-1 (Type 88 surface-to-ship missile)
 SSM-1C
 Type 12 Surface-to-Ship Missile
 SSM-1B (Type 90 ship-to-ship missile)
 SSM-2 (Type 17 ship-to-ship missile)
 SM-3 Block-II/IIA (Joint development with the U.S.)
 Type 07 (Type 07 Vertical Launched ASROC)

Nigeria 

Ogbunigwe (multipurpose missile)

North Korea 
Hwasong-1
Hwasong-3
Hwasong-5 (Scud-B)
Hwasong-6 (Scud-C)
Hwasong-7
Hwasong-9 (Scud-ER/ Scud-D/ Scud 2)
Hwasong-10
Hwasong-11 (KN-02 Toksa)
Hwasong-12
Hwasong-13
Hwasong-14
Hwasong-15
Hwasong-16
Pongae-5
Pukguksong-1, Pukguksong-2
Pukguksong-3
Pukguksong-4ㅅ/5ㅅ

Norway 

 Penguin (American designation AGM-119)
 NASAMS (SLAMRAAM missile) (Norwegian-American) land-based SHORAD system
 Naval Strike Missile
 Joint Strike Missile (see Naval Strike Missile)

Pakistan 
 

 KRL Baktar-Shikan – ATGM 
 KRL Anza Mk.1, Mk.2, Mk.3 – MANPADS
 KRL Hatf-I series – BRBM
 NESCOM Nasr (Hatf-IX) – TBM
 NESCOM Abdali – SRBM
 NESCOM Ghaznavi – SRBM
 NESCOM Shaheen-I series – SRBM
 KRL Ghauri I – MRBM
 KRL Ghauri II – MRBM
 NESCOM Ababeel – MRBM, MIRV Capable
 NESCOM Shaheen-II – MRBM
 NESCOM Shaheen-III – MRBM
 NESCOM Harbah — ship-launched antiship cruise missile and LACM
 NESCOM Babur series (Hatf VII)
 Babur 1 – LACM
 Babur 1A – LACM
 Babur 1B – LACM
 Babur 2 – LACM
 Babur 3 – SLCM/LACM
 NESCOM Ra'ad (Hatf-VIII) – ALCM
 NESCOM Ra'ad-II – long-range ALCM
 NESCOM Barq – laser guided air-to-surface missile

Poland 

 Grom (Russo-Polish)
 Piorun
 Poprad (Grom, Piorun missiles) land-based VSHORAD system

Russia 

The NATO reporting name of each missile is shown in parentheses behind the proper name.

Missiles:
 2K11 (SA-4 Ganef)
 2K22 (SA-19/SA-N-11 Grison)
 3M9 (SA-6 Gainful)
 3M55 (Russian: П-800 Оникс; English: Onyx), Yakhont (Russian: Яхонт; English: ruby), Kh-61, (SS-N-26 Strobile).
 4K10 (SS-N-6 Serb)
 4K18, R-27K (SS-NX-13 related to SS-N-6 Serb)
 4K40/4K51 (SS-N-2 Styx)
 4K60/4K65 (SA-N-3 Goblet)
 9K33 (SA-8/SA-N-4 Gecko)
 9K37 (SA-11/SA-N-7 Gadfly)
 9K38 (SA-17/SA-N-12 Grizzly)
 9K310 (SA-16 Igla)
 9K330/9K331/9K332 (SA-15/SA-N-9 Gauntlet)
 9K333 Verba (SA-25)
 9K720 Iskander (Russian: «Искандер»)(SS-26 Stone)
 82R (SS-N-15 Starfish)
 86R/88R (SS-N-16 Stallion)
 GR-1 Global Rocket fractional orbital bombardment system missile (SS-X-10 Scrag)
 Igla (SA-18/SA-N-10 Grouse)
 Igla-1 (SA-16 Gimlet)
 K-5 (AA-1 Alkali)
 K-8 (AA-3 Anab)
 K-9 (AA-4 Awl)
 K-13 (AA-2 Atoll)
 Kh-61
 KSR-2 (AS-5 Kelt)
 MR-UR-100 Sotka intercontinental ballistic missile (SS-17 Spanker)
 P-1 (SS-N-1 Scrubber)
 P-5 "Pyatyorka" (Russian: П-5 «Пятёрка»), (SS-N-3c Shaddock)
 P-6 (SS-N-3a Shaddock)
 P-7 "Pyatyorka" (SS-N-3b Shaddock)
 P-35 "Progress" (SS-N-3c Shaddock)
 P-270/Kh-41 long-range antiship missile (SS-N-22/ASM-MSS Sunburn)
 P-700 Granit (SS-N-19 Shipwreck)
 P-800 Oniks (Russian: П-800 Оникс; English: Onyx), Yakhont (Russian: Яхонт; English: ruby), 3M55, Kh-61, (SS-N-26 Strobile).
 R-1 theater ballistic missile (SS-1 Scunner)
 R-2 theater ballistic missile (SS-2 Sibling)
 R-4 (AA-5 Ash)
 R-5M rocket (SS-3 Shyster)
 R-7 Semyorka intercontinental ballistic missile (SS-6 Sapwood)
 R-9 Desna intercontinental ballistic missile (SS-8 Sasin)
 R-11 tactical ballistic missile (SS-1b Scud)
 R-12 Dvina theatre ballistic missile (SS-4 Sandal)
 R-13 submarine-launched ballistic missile (SS-N-4 Sark)
 R-14 Chusovaya theatre ballistic missile (SS-5 Skean)
 R-15 submarine-launched ballistic missile
 R-16 intercontinental ballistic missile (SS-7 Saddler)
 R-21 submarine-launched ballistic missile (SS-N-5 Serb)
 R-23 (AA-7 Apex)
 R-26 intercontinental ballistic missile (SS-8 Sasin)

 R-27 Zyb submarine-launched ballistic missile (SS-N-6 Serb)
 R-27K, 4K18 (SS-NX-13)
 R-27 (AA-10 Alamo)
 R-29 Vysota (Russian: Р-29 Высота height, altitude) (SS-N-18 Stingray)
 R-31 RSM-45 (SS-N-17 Snipe)
 R-33 (AA-9 Amos)
 R-36 intercontinental ballistic missile (SS-9 Scarp and SS-18 Satan)
 R-37 (AA-13 Arrow)
 R-39 missile (SS-N-20 Sturgeon)
 R-40 (AA-6 Acrid)
 R-46 intercontinental ballistic missile
 R-60 (AA-8 Aphid)
 R-73 (AA-11 Archer)
 R-77 (AA-12 Adder)
 R-300 Elbrus theatre ballistic missile (SS-1c Scud)
 R-400 Oka mobile theatre ballistic missile (SS-23 Spider)
 RS-24 intercontinental ballistic missile (SS-29) (Unknown)
 RS-26 intercontinental ballistic missile.
 RT-1 theater ballistic missile
 RT-2 intercontinental ballistic missile (SS-13 Savage)
 RT-2PM Topol mobile intercontinental ballistic missile (SS-25 Sickle)
 RT-2UTTH Topol M mobile intercontinental ballistic missile (SS-27)
 RT-15 mobile theatre ballistic missile (SS-14 Scamp)
 RT-20 intercontinental ballistic missile (SS-15 Scrooge)
 RT-21 Temp 2S mobile intercontinental ballistic missile (SS-16 Sinner)
 RT-21M Pioner mobile medium range ballistic missile (SS-20 Saber)
 RT-23 Molodets intercontinental ballistic missile (SS-24 Scalpel)
 RT-25 theatre ballistic missile
 S-25 (SA-1 Guild)
 S-75 (SA-2/SA-N-2 Guideline)
 S-125 (SA-3/SA-N-1 Goa)
 S-200 (SA-5 Gammon)
 S-300P (SA-10 Grumble/SA-N-6/SA-20 Gargoyle/SA-X-21 Triumf)
 S-300V (SA-12 Gladiator/Giant)
 S-300PMU-1/2 (SA-20 Gargoyle) 
 S-400 (SA-21 Growler)
 Sakar-20
 Strela-1 (SA-9 Gaskin)
 Strela-2 (SA-7/SA-N-5 Grail)
 Strela-3 (SA-14/SA-N-8 Gremlin)
 Strela-10 (SA-13 Gopher)
 RS-28 Sarmat (Russian: РС-28 Сармат) (SS-X-30)
 TR-1 Temp theater ballistic missile (SS-12 / SS-22 Scaleboard)
 UR-100 intercontinental ballistic missile (SS-11 Sego)
 UR-100N intercontinental ballistic missile (SS-19 Stiletto)
 UR-200 intercontinental ballistic missile (SS-X-10 Scrag)
 Yakhont (Russian: Яхонт; English: ruby)

By NATO name 

 AA-1 Alkali / Kaliningrad K-5
 AA-2 Atoll / Vympel K-13
 AA-3 Anab / Kaliningrad K-8
 AA-4 Awl / K-9
 AA-5 Ash / R-4
 AA-6 Acrid / R-40
 AA-7 Apex / R-23
 AA-8 Aphid / R-60
 AA-9 Amos / R-33
 AA-10 Alamo / R-27
 AA-11 Archer / R-73
 AA-12 Adder / R-77
 AA-13 Arrow / R-37
 AS-1 Kennel antiship
 AS-2 Kipper antiship
 AS-3 Kangaroo nuclear antiship
 AS-4 Kitchen antiship
 AS-5 Kelt air-to-surface
 AS-6 Kingfisher antiship
 AS-7 Kerry
AS-8 (9M114V Sturm-V)
AS-9 'Kyle' (H-28)
AS-10 'Karen' (H-25)
AS-11 'Kilter' (H-58 Izdeliye)
AS-12 'Kegler' (H-25MP, H-27PS)
AS-13 'Kingbolt' (H-59 Ovod)
AS-14 'Kedge' (H-29)
AS-15 'Kent' (H-55/H-65S Izdeliye)
AS-16 'Kickback' (H-15)
AS-17 'Krypton' (H-31)
AS-18 Kazoo (H-59M Ovod-M)
AS-19 'Koala' (3M25A Meteorit-A)
AS-20 'Kayak' (H-35/H-37 Uran)
AS-21 (Gela, P-750 Grom)
 (SA-1 Guild) S-25
 (SA-2/SA-N-2 Guideline) S-75
 (SA-3/SA-N-1 Goa) S-125
 (SA-N-3 Goblet) 4K60/4K65
 (SA-4 Ganef) 2K11
 (SA-5 Gammon) S-200
 (SA-6 Gainful) 3M9
 (SA-7/SA-N-5 Grail) Strela-2
 (SA-8/SA-N-4 Gecko) 9K33
 (SA-9 Gaskin) Strela-1
 (SA-10 Grumble/SA-N-6/SA-20 Gargoyle/SA-X-21 Triumf) S-300P
 (SA-11/SA-N-7 Gadfly) 9K37
 (SA-12 Gladiator/Giant) S-300V
 (SA-13 Gopher) Strela-10
 (SA-14/SA-N-8 Gremlin) Strela-3
 (SA-15/SA-N-9 Gauntlet) 9K330/9K331/9K332
 (SA-16 Gimlet) Igla-1
 (SA-17/SA-N-12 Grizzly) 9K38
 (SA-18/SA-N-10 Grouse) Igla
 (SA-19/SA-N-11 Grison) 2K22
 (SA-20 Gargoyle) S-300PMU-1/2
 (SA-21 Growler) S-400
 (SA-25) 9K333 Verba

 SS-1 Scunner / R-1
 SS-1b Scud / R-11
 SS-1c Scud / R-300
 SS-2 Sibling / R-2
 SS-3 Shyster / R-5
 SS-4 Sandal / R-12 Dvina
 SS-5 Skean / R-14 Chusovaya
 SS-6 Sapwood / R-7 Semyorka
 SS-7 Saddler / R-16
 SS-8 Sasin / R-9 Desna
 SS-8 Sasin / R-26 (mistaken identification by NATO)
 SS-9 Scarp / R-36
 SS-10 Scrag / Global Rocket 1
 SS-11 Sego / UR-100
 SS-12 Scaleboard / TR-1 Temp
 SS-13 Savage / RT-2
 SS-14 Scamp / RT-15
 SS-15 Scrooge / RT-20
 SS-16 Sinner / RT-21 Temp 2S
 SS-17 Spanker / MR-UR-100 Sotka
 SS-18 Satan / R-36M
 SS-19 Stiletto / UR-100N
 SS-20 Saber / RT-21M Pioner
 SS-21 Scarab / OTR-21 Tochka
 SS-22 Scaleboard / TR-1 Temp
 SS-23 Spider / R-400 Oka
 SS-24 Scalpel / RT-23 Molodets
 SS-25 Sickle / RT-2PM Topol
 SS-26 Stone / 9K720 Iskander (Russian: «Искандер»)
 SS-27 / RT-2UTTH Topol M
 SS-29 / RS-24 intercontinental ballistic missile
 SS-N-1 Scrubber / P-1
 SS-N-2 Styx / 4K40/4K51
 SS-N-3c Shaddock / P-5 Pyatyorka (Russian: П-5 «Пятёрка»)
 SS-N-3a Shaddock / P-6
 SS-N-3b Shaddock / P-7
 variant of SS-N-3 Shaddock P-35 Progress
 SS-N-4 Sark / R-13
 SS-N-5 Serb / R-21
 SS-N-6 Serb / R-27
 SS-N-15 Starfish / 82R
 SS-N-16 Stallion / 86R/88R
 SS-N-17 Snipe / R-31 RSM-45
 SS-N-18 Stingray / R-29 Vysota
 SS-N-19 Shipwreck / P-700 rocket
 SS-N-20 Sturgeon / R-39
 SS-N-21 Sampson / Raduga Kh-55
 SS-N-22 Sunburn / P-270
 SS-N-23 Skiff / R-29 Vysota, R-29 Vysota, R-29RMU Sineva
 SS-N-25 Switchblade / Kh-35
 SS-N-26 Strobile.P-800 Oniks (Russian: П-800 Оникс; English: Onyx), Yakhont (Russian: Яхонт; English: ruby), 3M55, Kh-61
 SS-N-27 Sizzler / 3M-54 Klub Kalibr
 SS-X-10 Scrag / Global Rocket 1 / GR-1
 SS-X-10 Scrag / UR-200
 SS-X-30 / RS-28 Sarmat (Russian: РС-28 Сармат)
 SS-NX-13 / 4K18, R-27K related to SS-N-6

Serbia 

 Advanced Light Attack System (ALAS) long-range multipurpose guided missile
 Grom-B (Serbo-Russian)
Šumadija (multiple rocket launcher) Uses Jerina 1 ( 285 km ballistic missile)

South Africa

RSA Series
 RSA-1 (Variant of the Jericho II second stage for use as a mobile missile)
 RSA-2 (Variant of the Jericho II)
 RSA-3 (Variant of the Shavit)
 RSA-4 (Upper stages of the Shavit with a heavy first stage)
(Above missile prototypes made by Houwteq, none entered production)

Other
 A-Darter
 R-Darter
 ZT3 Ingwe
 Mokopa
 MUPSOW
 Torgos Air-Launched Cruise Missile
 Umkhonto
 Umbani
(Above missiles made by Denel Dynamics)

South Korea 

Legend: In South Korean service

 Baeksangeo (White Shark) heavyweight torpedo
 Cheolmae-2 (KM-SAM) medium-range surface-to-air missile
 Cheongsangeo (Blue Shark) lightweight torpedo
 Chiron surface-to-air missile
 C-Star ship-to-ship missile
 KL-SAM ground-based long-range surface-to-air SAM/ABM
 KAGM air-to-ground missile
 K-BATS multipayload tactical ballistic missile system
 K-LOGIR 2.75 inch (70 mm) missile
 Haeseong I antiship missile
 Haeseong II ship-to-surface cruise missile
 Haeseong III antiship cruise missile
 Hongsangeo (Red Shark) rocket-based torpedo and antisubmarine missile (K-ASROC)
 Baekgom tactical ballistic missile
 Hyunmoo-1 tactical ballistic missile
 Hyunmoo-2A tactical ballistic missile
 Hyunmoo-2B tactical ballistic missile
 Hyunmoo-2C tactical ballistic missile
 Hyunmoo-3A tactical cruise missile
 Hyunmoo-3B tactical cruise missile
 Hyunmoo-3C tactical cruise missile
 Hyunmoo-3D tactical cruise missile
 Hyunmoo-4 ballistic missile
 Pegasus surface-to-air missile
 K-SAAM ship-based antimissile missile (ABM)
 Hyun-Gung antitank missile
 K-RAM surface-to-air missile (SAM)
 Leaflet 130 mm ship-to-ship guided missile
 Tactical Flag ship-to-surface guided missile
 KGGB GPS-guided air-to-surface missile

Sweden 

Legend: In European service

 Bantam
 RB 04
 Rb 05
 Rb 08
 RBS-15
 RBS 23
 RBS 56 BILL
 RBS 56B BILL 2
 RBS 70
 MSHORAD (Bolide missile) land-based VSHORAD system

Switzerland 

Legend: In European service

 MIM-146 ADATS (Swiss-American)
 RSA
 RSC-54
 RSC-56
 RSC-57
 RSC/RSD 58
 RSE Kriens

Taiwan 

Legend: In Taiwanese service

 Hsiung Feng I (HF-1) (anti-ship)
 Hsiung Feng II (HF-2) (anti-ship)
 Hsiung Feng IIE (HF-2E) (long range land-attack cruise missile)
 Hsiung Feng III (HF-3) (supersonic anti-ship and/or land-attack cruise missile)
 Sky Bow I (TK-1) (SAM)
 Sky Bow II (TK-2) (SAM)
 Sky Bow III (TK-3) (SAM)
 Sky Spear (short range SSBM)
 Sky Horse (ballistic missile)
 Sky Sword I (TC-1) (air-to-air)
 TC-1L (SAM variant)
 Sea TC-1 (Naval variant)
 Sky Sword II (TC-2) (air-to-air)
 TC-2A (Anti-radiation variant)
 TC-2N (Naval variant)
 TC-2C (Advanced air-to-air variant)
 Wan Chien (air launched cruise missile)
 Yun Feng (supersonic long-range cruise missile)

Turkey 
Legend: In Turkish service
 Karaok, man-portable short-range Anti-tank guided missile
 Roketsan TANOK,  Laser Guided  Anti-Tank Missile
 Roketsan CİDA, Guided missile
 Laser-guided mini missile system,  short-range, laser-guided missile
 Roketsan METE, Laser-guided Miniature Missile
 Roketsan Cirit, laser-guided air-to-surface missile
 OMTAS, Medium-range, anti-tank Air-to-surface missile
 UMTAS, Long-range, anti-tank Air-to-surface missile
 Roketsan Bora, Tactical Ballistic Missile
 Roketsan J-600T Yıldırım, Tactical Ballistic Missile
 Roketsan TAYFUN, Short-range ballistic missile
 PMADS, naval/land-based Surface-to-air missile
 Sungur Air Defence Missile System, Surface-to-air missile
 Sungur, man-portable air defense system
  Aselsan Hisar Air-defense System
 Aselsan Hisar-A+, surface-to-air missile,
 Aselsan Hisar-O+, surface-to-air missile
 Aselsan Hisar-U, surface-to-air missile
 Aselsan Siper, surface-to-air missile
  GÖKTUĞ Air-to-air Missile Program
 Bozdoğan, air-to-air missile
 Gökdoğan, air-to-air missile
 Akdoğan, air-to-air missile
 Gökhan, air-to-air missile
TUBITAK-SAGE KUZGUN
 Kuzgun-TJ,  Turbojet-powered, Air-to-surface missile.
 Kuzgun-KY,  Solid fuel Rocket-powered, Air-to-surface missile.
 Kuzgun-ER,  Turbojet-powered, Air-to-surface missile
 Kuzgun-EW, Air-to-surface missile that is capable of carrying Electronic warfare payload.
 Roketsan SOM,  Anti-ship,  Air-launched Cruise Missile
 ROKETSAN ÇAKIR Missile Family,  Anti-ship, Air-to-surface,  surface-to-surface Cruise Missile
 Çakır CR
 Çakır AS
 Çakır LIR
 Çakır SW
 Roketsan Atmaca, Anti-ship, Surface-to-surface Cruise Missile
 Kara Atmaca, Surface-to-surface Cruise Missile
 Akbaba,  Anti-radiation Missile (ARM)
 Roketsan Gezgin,  Surface-to-surface, Long-range Cruise Missile, It'll be equivalent to Tomahawk missiles.
 TRLG-122,  Short-range Surface-to-surface missile
 TRLG-230, Medium-range Surface-to-surface missile
 TRG-300 Tiger, Long-range Surface-to-surface missile
 TRG-230-iHA, Supersonic, Air-to-surface missile

Ukraine 

Legend: In Ukrainian service

 Dnipro
 Hrim-2
 Neptune
 Sapsan
 Vilkha

United Kingdom 

 ALARM
 ASRAAM (AIM-132) "advanced short-range air-to-air missile"
 Bloodhound long-range surface-to-air missile (SAM)
 Blowfish submarine mast VSHORAD system
 Blowpipe     man-portable surface-to-air missile (SAM)
 Blue Steel  nuclear "stand-off bomb"
 Blue Streak nuclear "stand-off missile" (never produced)
 Blue Water – surface-to-surface nuclear missile
 Brakemine WW II surface-to-air missile project
 Brimstone
 CAMM "Common Anti-aircraft Modular Missile"
 Fairey Fireflash air-to-air missile
 Fairey Stooge  antiship missile
 Fire Shadow
 Firestreak air-to-air missile
 Green Cheese
 Javelin man-portable surface-to-air missile (SAM)
 Malkara (Australian-British)
 Martlet
 Polaris (British-American version)
 Rapier battlefield surface-to-air missile (SAM)
 Red Dean
 Red Hebe
 Red Top air-to-air missile
 Sea Cat shipboard surface-to-air missile (SAM)
 Sea Dart shipboard surface-to-air missile
 Sea Eagle air launched anti-ship missile
 Sea Skua air launched anti-ship missile
 Sea Slug shipboard surface-to-air missile
 Sea Wolf shipboard surface-to-air missile 
 Skybolt ALBM nuclear "stand-off missile" (British-American version) (never produced)
 Skyflash - British-produced equivalent to American "Sparrow" missile
 SPEAR "Selective Precision Effects At Range"
 Starburst
 Starstreak
 Swingfire antitank missile
 Thunderbird
 Tigercat
 UB.109T cruise missile (cancelled)
 Vickers Vigilant

United States

Missile Design Series (Unified)

US DoD 4120 Mission Design Series (MDS) Designators and Symbols for Guided Missiles, Rockets, Probes, Boosters, and Satellites.

Sample Missile MDS – "BGM-109G" or LGM-30G-Silo Launched Surface Attack Guided Missile

Legend: 

The list of U. S. missiles, sorted by ascending MDS number:

 MGM-1 Matador
 MGR-1 Honest John
 RIM-2 Terrier
 MGR-3 Little John
 MIM-3 Nike-Ajax
 AIM-4 Falcon
 MGM-5 Corporal
 RGM-6 Regulus
 
 POLE-015 0-MAN - SERIES/SURFACE TO AIR/AIR TO SURFACE
 RIM-8 Talos
 
 CIM-10 Bomarc
 PGM-11 Redstone
 AGM-12 Bullpup
 MGM-13 Mace
 MIM-14 Nike-Hercules
 RGM-15 Regulus II
 CGM-16 / HGM-16 Atlas
 PGM-17 Thor
 MGM-18 Lacrosse
 PGM-19 Jupiter
 MIM-23 Hawk
 RIM-24 Tartar
 LGM-25 Titan
 AIM-26 Falcon
 UGM-27 Polaris
 AGM-28 Hound Dog
 MGM-29 Sergeant
 
 MGM-31 Pershing
 BGM-34 Firebee
 LGM-35 Sentinel
 FIM-43 Redeye
 UUM-44 SUBROC
 AGM-45 Shrike
 MIM-46 Mauler
 AIM-47 Falcon
 AGM-48 Skybolt (cancelled)
 LIM-49 Nike Zeus/Spartan
 RIM-50 Typhon LR
 MGM-51 Shillelagh
 MGM-52 Lance
 AGM-53 Condor
 AIM-54 Phoenix
 RIM-55 Typhon MR
 RGM-59 Taurus (cancelled)

 AGM-62 Walleye
 AGM-63 (cancelled)
 AGM-64 Hornet
 AGM-65 Maverick
 
 
 AIM-68 Big Q (cancelled)
 AGM-69 SRAM
 LEM-70 Minuteman ERCS
 
 MIM-72 Chaparral
 UGM-73 Poseidon
 BGM-75 AICBM (cancelled)
 AGM-76 Falcon
 FGM-77 Dragon
 AGM-78 Standard ARM
 AGM-79 Blue Eye (cancelled)
 AGM-80 Viper
 AIM-82 (cancelled)
 AGM-83 Bulldog (cancelled)
 
 RIM-85 (cancelled)
 
 AGM-87 Focus
 
 UGM-89 Perseus (cancelled)
  man-portable surface-to-air (SAM)
 AIM-95 Agile (cancelled)
 UGM-96 Trident I
 AIM-97 Seekbat (cancelled)
 LIM-99
 LIM-100
 RIM-101 (cancelled)
 
 
 BGM-110 SLCM
  (GBU-15)
 RIM-113 SIRCS
 
  (Germano-American)
 LGM-118 Peacekeeper

 
 CGM-121B Seek Spinner
 AGM-122 Sidearm
 AGM-123 Skipper
 AGM-124 Wasp (cancelled)
 UUM-125 Sea Lance (cancelled)
 AGM-129 ACM
 AGM-130 Ripper
 AGM-131 SRAM II (cancelled)
 
 MGM-134 Midgetman
 ASM-135 ASAT
 AGM-136 Tacit Rainbow (cancelled)
 AGM-137 TSSAM (cancelled)
 
 
 MIM-146 ADATS (Swiss-American)
 
 AIM-152 AAAM (cancelled)
 AGM-153 (cancelled)
 
 
 MGM-157 EFOGM
 
 AGM-159 JASSM (cancelled)
 
 
 
 
 MGM-166 LOSAT (cancelled)
 
 AGM-169 JCM (cancelled)
 FGM-172 SRAW

Joint Designation System of 1947

Test Vehicle Designations

Sequence Numbers:

Air Force: Consecutive numerical sequence for each missile mission type.

Army: Single numerical sequence until 1948 when the sequence numbers were restarted.

Navy: Initially even numbers transitioning to sequential.

Sample Vehicle Designation "SSM-A-2 Navaho"

Sample Test Vehicle Designation "RTV-G-1 WAC Corporal"

United States Air Force Designation Systems

United States Air Force Designation System, 1947–1951

The list of missiles sorted by ascending Air Force 1947–1951 designations.

 AAM-A-1 Firebird
 AAM-A-2 Falcon
 ASM-A-1 TARZON
 ASM-A-2 RASCAL
 LTV-A-1 Doodle Bug
 PTV-A-1
 RTV-A-1
 RTV-A-2 HIROC
 RTV-3 NATIV

 RTV-A-4 Shrike
 RTV-A-5
 SAM-A-1 GAPA
 SSM-A-1 Matador
 SSM-A-2 Navaho
 SSM-A-3 Snark
 SSM-A-4 Navaho II
 SSM-A-5 Boojum
 SSM-A-6 Navaho III

United States Air Force Designation System, 1951–1955

During this timeframe, the U.S. Air Force treated missiles as pilotless aircraft.

The list of missiles sorted by ascending Air Force 1951–1955 designations.

 B-61 Matador
 B-62 Snark
 B-63 RASCAL
 B-64 Navaho
 B-65 Atlas
 B-67 Crossbow

 F-98 Falcon
 F-99 Bomarc
 F-104 Falcon1

 X-7
 X-8
 X-9 Shrike
 X-10
 X-112
 X-122
 X-17

1A version of the Falcon missile was briefly designated the F-104 before it was redesignated as the F-98.

2The X-11 and X-12 designations were assigned to one and three engine test missiles that would have been used to develop a five-engine version of the Atlas missile.

United States Air Force Designation System, 1955–1963

For all basic missions except GAR (which started at 1) the sequence number started after 67 which was the last bomber designation used for guided missiles.

Sample Air Force 1955–1963 designation: "XSM-73"

The list of missiles sorted by ascending Air Force 1955–1963 designations.

 TM-61 Matador
 SM-62 Snark
 GAM-63 RASCAL
 SM-64 Navaho
 SM-65 Atlas
 GAM-67 Crossbow
 SM-68 Titan
 IM-69 Bomarc
 IM-70 Talos
 GAM-71 Buck Duck
 SM-73 Bull Goose
 SM-74
 SM-75 Thor
 TM-76 Mace
 GAM-77 Hound Dog
 SM-78

 GAM-79 White Lance
 SM-80 Minuteman
 RM-81 Agena
 RM-82 Loki-Dart
 GAM-83 Bullpup
 RM-84 Aerobee-Hi
 RM-85 Nike-Cajun
 RM-86 Exos
 GAM-87 Skybolt
 SRM-88 Rocksonde 200
 RM-89 Blue Scout I
 RM-90 Blue Scout II
 RM-91 Blue Scout Junior
 RM-92 Blue Scout Junior
 IM-99 Bomarc
 AIM-101 Sparrow

 GAR-1 Falcon
 GAR-2 Falcon
 GAR-3 Falcon
 GAR-4 Falcon
 GAR-5 Falcon
 GAR-6 Falcon
 GAR-8 Sidewider
 GAR-9 Falcon
 GAR-11 Nuclear Falcon

United States Navy Designation Systems

United States Navy Designation System 1941 – 1945

The list of missiles sorted by ascending Navy 1941 – 1945 designations.

 Interstate BDR
 LBD Gargoyle
 LBE-1 Glomb
 LBP-1 Glomb
 LBT-1 Glomb

United States Navy Designation System 1946 – 1947

The list of missiles sorted by ascending Navy 1946–1947 designations.

 KAM Little Joe
 KAN Little Joe
 KA2N Gorgon IIA
 KA3N Gorgon IIIA
 KAQ Lark
 KAS Sparrow
 KAY Lark
 KGN Gorgon IIC

 KGW Loon
 KSD Gargoyle
 KUD Gargoyle
 KUM Gorgon IV
 KUN Gorgon IIC
 KU2N Gorgon IIA
 KU3N Gorgon III
 KUW Loon

United States Navy Designation System 1947 – 1963

The list of missiles sorted by ascending Navy 1947–1963 designations.

 AAM-N-2 Sparrow I
 AAM-N-3 Sparrow II
 AAM-N-4 Oriole
 AAM-N-5 Meteor
 AAM-N-6 Sparrow III
 AAM-N-7 Sidewinder
 AAM-N-9 Sparrow X
 AAM-N-10 Eagle
 AAM-N-11 Phoenix
 ASM-N-2 Bat
 ASM-N-4 Dove
 ASM-N-5 Gorgon V
 ASM-N-6 Omar
 ASM-N-7 Bullpup
 ASM-N-8 Corvus
 ASM-N-10 Shrike
 ASM-N-11 Condor

 AUM-N-4 Diver
 AUM-N-6 Puffin
 SAM-N-2 Lark
 SAM-N-4 Lark
 SAM-N-6 Talos
 SAM-N-7 Terrier
 SAM-N-8 Zeus
 SAM-N-8 Typhon LR
 SAM-N-9 Typhon MR
 SSM-N-2 Triton
 SSM-N-4 Taurus
 SSM-N-6 Rigel
 SSM-N-8 Regulus
 SSM-N-9 Lacrosse
 SSM-N-9 Regulus II
 SUM-N-2 Grebe
 CTV-N-2 Gorgon IIC
 CTV-N-4 Gorgon IIA

 CTV-N-6 Gorgon IIIA
 CTV-N-8 Bumblebee STV
 CTV-N-9 Lark
 CTV-N-10 Lark
 LTV-N-2 Loon
 LTV-N-4
 PTV-N-2 Gorgon IV
 PTV-N-4 Bumblebee BTV
 RTV-N-2 Gargoyle
 RTV-N-4 Gorgon IIIC
 RTV-N-6 Bumblebee XPM
 RTV-N-8 Aerobee
 RTV-N-10 Aerobee
 RTV-N-12 Viking
 RTV-N-13 Aerobee 150
 RTV-N-15 Pollux
 RV-N-16 Oriole

United States Army Designation Systems

United States Army Designation System 1941 – 1947

The list of missiles sorted by ascending Army 1941–1947 designations.

 JB-1 Bat
 JB-2 Doodle Bug
 JB-3 Tiamet
 JB-4 Project MX-607
 JB-5 Project MX-595
 JB-6 Project MX-600
 JB-7 Project MX-605
 JB-8 GAPA
 JB-9 Project MX-626
 JB-10 Bat

United States Army Designation System 1948 – 1955

The list of missiles sorted by ascending Army 1948 – 1955 designations.

 RTV-G-1 WAC Corporal
 RTV-G-2 Corporal E
 RTV-G-3 Hermes II
 RTV-G-4 Bumper
 CTV-G-5 Hermes A-1
 RTV-G-6 Hermes B-1
 SAM-G-7 Nike Ajax
 SSM-G-8 Hermes A-3A
 SSM-G-9 Hermes B-2
 RTV-G-10 Hermes A-2
 SSM-G-12 Martin Lacrosse
 SSM-G-13 Hermes A-2

 PGM-11 Redstone
 SSM-G-15 Hermes A-1
 SSM-G-16 Hermes A-3B
 SSM-G-17 Corporal
 SAM-A-18 Hawk
 SAM-A-19 Plato
 RV-A-22 Lark
 SSM-A-23 Dart
 SAM-A-25 Nike Hercules
 SSM-A-27 Sergeant

United States Army Designation System 1955 – 1963

The list of missiles sorted by ascending Army 1955–1963 designations.

 M1 Nike-Ajax
 M2 Corporal
 M3 Hawk
 M4 Lacrosse
 M6 Nike-Hercules
 M8 Redstone
 M9 Redstone
 M13 Shillelagh
 XM14 Pershing
 M15 Sergeant
 M16 Hawk
 M18 Hawk
 XM19 Pershing
 M50 Honest John

United States Undesignated Missiles

The list of undesignated United States missiles sorted alphabetically:

 A-1
 Affordable Weapon
 Alpha Draco
 ALVRJ
 Aries
 APKWS
 ASALM
 ATASK
 Athena
 Bold Orion
 Brazo
 Caleb
 Caster 4B
 Cherokee
 Compact Kinetic Energy Missile
 Cree
 Crow
 D-40 Cannonball

 ERAM
 ERIS
 FABMDS
 Farside
 FLAGE
 Flying Bomb
 GBI
 HAVE DASH II
 HEDI
 Hera
 HGV
 HIBEX
 High Virgo
 HOE
 HOPI
 HTV
 HVM
 HyFly

 Jindivik1
 Kettering Bug
 LMAMS
 LAM
 LASRM
 LOCAAS
 M30 Guided MRLS
 Miniature Hit-to-Kill Missile
 NOTSNIK
 PAM
 PLV
 Pogo
 Pogo-Hi
 Private
 Rapier2
 RATTLRS
 RSC-51
 Pershing II
 Senior Prom

 Sergent-Hydac
 Shavetail
 SIAM
 Skokie I
 Skokie II
 SLAM
 Spike
 Sprint
 SR19/SR19
 SRALT
 STARS
 Storm
 T-16
 T-22
 Talos-Sergeant-Hydac
 THAAD
 Trailblazer 2
 Wagtail
 Wizard

1Australian target missile briefly used by the United States Navy.

2The United States procured Rapier missile systems for the air defense of United States Air Force Bases in the United Kingdom.

United States Missiles with X Designations

The list of X designated United States missiles numerically:

 X-7
 X-8
 X-9 Shrike
 X-10
 X-11
 X-12
 X-17
 X-41
 X-42
 X-43 Hyper-X
 X-51

See also
List of missiles
List of anti-tank missiles
List of active missiles of the United States military

References

Missiles by country
Missiles